Swadhin Kshatriya was the Chief Secretary Government of Maharashtra and senior most Civil service IAS officer in Maharashtra.

He was appointed to organize Prime minister Narendra Modi's pet project Make in India in Maharashtra by the Government.

Swadhin Kshatriya was also the Municipal commissioner of Mumbai from 2009 to 2011.

Swadhin Kshatriya is a 1980 batch of the Maharashtra Civil service IAS.

References

Government of Maharashtra
Indian Administrative Service officers